Hugh Massy may refer to:

 Hugh Massy (British Army officer) (1884–1965)
 Hugh Massy, 1st Baron Massy (1700–1788), Anglo-Irish peer and politician
 Hugh Massy, 2nd Baron Massy (1733–1790), Anglo-Irish politician and peer
 Sir Hugh Massy, 1st Baronet (died 1807), Anglo-Irish politician and baronet
 Sir Hugh Massy, 2nd Baronet (1767–1842), Anglo-Irish politician and baronet